A variety of religious emblems programs are used by the Boy Scouts of America (BSA) to encourage youth to learn about their faith and to recognize adults who provide significant service to youth in a religious environment. These religious programs are created, administered and awarded by the various religious groups, not the BSA, but each program must be recognized by the BSA.

Award
The award given by the religious organization consists of a unique medal for each program— usually only worn on formal occasions. The award is also recognized by the wear of an embroidered square knot emblem— silver on purple for youth and purple on silver for adults. The knot emblem is universal in that it does not represent any specific religion or religious award program. Each medal is designed and produced by the religious institution, while the knot emblems are produced by the BSA. Many Protestant churches use The PRAY Program, formerly God and Country, series consisting of God and Me, God and Family, God and Church, and God and Life; although they use the same program, the medals are unique in design according to each denomination.

The youth religious knot may be further identified as to level by the wear of a miniature pin-on device. The first-level program is identified by the Cub Scout device and the second by the Webelos device. The third-level uses the Boy Scout device. The fourth-level program for Venturers, senior Boy Scouts and senior Varsity Scouts is recognized by the use of the Venturer device, regardless of the program division of the youth.

Origins
The BSA version of the Scout Law states in part: "A Scout is reverent. He is reverent toward God. He is faithful in his religious duties and respects the convictions of others in matters of custom and religion." The BSA "Declaration of Religious Principle" states that "no member can grow into the best kind of citizen without recognizing an obligation of God and, therefore, recognizes the religious element in the training of the member, but it is absolutely nonsectarian in its attitude toward that religious training. Its policy is that the home and organization or group with which the member is connected shall give definite attention to religious life."

The first religious recognition program for Scouts began in 1926 when the Roman Catholic Archdiocese of Los Angeles began the Ad Altare Dei for altar boys who were Boy Scouts. The program was expanded nationally in 1939 and the BSA approved the medal for uniform wear.

The first Protestant religious emblem program was established in 1943 by the Lutheran church as Pro Deo Et Patria. The Jewish Ner Tamid program began in 1944 and the God and Country program used by several Protestant denominations followed in 1945. The 1948 handbook was the first to include the religious emblem programs and it described Roman Catholic, Jewish, Mormon (LDS), Buddhist, Lutheran and the general Protestant program. As of 2007 there are over 35 religious groups represented by over 75 recognized emblems. The knot for the youth emblems was introduced in 1971 and for the adult emblems in 1973.

Program approval
Prior to 1993, the BSA simply reviewed the programs developed by each faith. After requests for new awards in 1993, the BSA established a policy statement outlining requirements for recognition. To gain recognition, a proposed program must be approved by the BSA Religious Relationships Committee. The medal or badge design must also be approved and must be different from the emblems of other programs.

Programs of Religious Activities with Youth
Programs of Religious Activities with Youth, more commonly known as P.R.A.Y., is a not-for-profit organization that administers a series of religious recognitions programs that may be used by agencies such as the BSA, Girl Scouts of the USA, Camp Fire, American Heritage Girls, and other youth groups.

P.R.A.Y. consists of a national board and a business office. The national board of directors is a Christian organization with representatives from churches and national youth agencies. The board develops the curriculum and establishes guidelines for the P.R.A.Y. Program—formerly the God and Country program—used by many Protestant churches. The P.R.A.Y. business office processes orders for the medals and reference materials used in The PRAY Program and the programs of other religious organizations.

Other religious organizations have requested that the P.R.A.Y. business office administer their awards since they handle religious recognitions orders on a full-time basis. The requests are taken to the board of directors for consideration on a case-by-case basis. The religious organizations which contract with the P.R.A.Y. business office retain all responsibility for curriculum development and establishing program guidelines, and the P.R.A.Y. business office processes their orders. Thus, P.R.A.Y. has become an interfaith resource.

Each agency determines which P.R.A.Y.-administered programs meet their standards before giving their recognition. All of the BSA recognized programs are listed through P.R.A.Y., regardless of whether they are administered by P.R.A.Y.

Other youth agencies
Members of the Boy Scouts of America who earned a religious emblem through another youth agency such as the Girl Scouts of the USA, Camp Fire USA or a Sunday school group may wear the emblem on their BSA uniform. They may also wear the square knot insignia without a device.

Smaller programs
The Covenant of the Goddess is one of the oldest and largest cross-traditional groups among Wiccans and neopagans. In the early 1990s, they created the Over the Moon and the Hart and Crescent programs for youth and the Distinguished Youth Service Award for adults. The Covenant of the Goddess approached the BSA for recognition of these programs. The BSA declined and later adopted the policy requiring that a religious group must first charter at least 25 BSA units before its religious awards program may be recognized. P.R.A.Y. currently does not list any of the Covenant of the Goddess religious programs. The policy requiring a religious group to charter at least 25 BSA units before its religious awards can be recognized is no longer in place.

Approved programs and awards
The following awards are recognized by the BSA and the religious emblems knot may be worn upon completion of the program.

While optional, the programs may be used to fulfill certain requirements of the Cub Scout Bear and Webelos ranks, the Venturing Religious Life Bronze Award and the Venturing TRUST Award. Instruction for these programs is provided by the religious organization; unit leaders are involved only if they are also part of the religious organization. Many of the religious programs involve the youth's parents.

Many of the religious organizations also have awards for adult BSA members; however, these awards are almost always recognition for service to the religion within Scouting. The adults are nominated for the award; they do not go through a program.

Other awards
P.R.A.Y. has developed several other awards that are not specifically recognized by the BSA. Mentors may be recognized by a pin or pendant that may be worn on non-Scouting apparel. There is also a four-star recognition pin for youth who have earned all four levels of their program. Other groups may have similar awards for individuals and units that are not listed through P.R.A.Y. If approved by the local council, they may be worn as temporary insignia on the right pocket of the Scout uniform.

P.R.A.Y. also offers its own "Duty to God" segment patch program for Scouts of all ages and adult advisers of all faiths, designed to promote their religious awards programs. To earn the patch, girls and adults must attend or make an interfaith presentation about religious awards, then fulfill a personal commitment of their choice that fulfills their "duty to God" as promised in the Boy Scout Oath, such as promoting, earning, or helping another girl earn the religious award for her faith. There are four segments for the patch. One is offered yearly, called the "anchor patch", while the other three are offered yearly on a rotational basis. After one patch is released, the previous year's patch is discontinued for the next three years, then is reinstated again for a one-year period. As of August 2008, only two of these three patches have been released.

National Association of Presbyterian Scouters 

The Celtic Cross award is given to adults active as a youth leader associated with a Presbyterian Church program, including Boy Scouts of America youth leaders and any other group or organization that chooses to give the award. To receive the award an adult must demonstrate "exceptional Christian character", or has given faithful service to a youth program(s) of a congregation by serving in church leadership positions.

Unitarian Universalist

Unitarian Universalist Association

The Unitarian Universalist Association (UUA)—the religious association of most Unitarian Universalist congregations in the United States—has two religious emblems programs that are recognized by the BSA.

History
In 1992 the UUA Board of Trustees approved a resolution opposing the BSA's policies on homosexuals, atheists and agnostics; and in 1993, the UUA updated Religion in Life to include criticism of these BSA policies.

In 1998, the BSA withdrew recognition of Religion in Life, stating that such information was incompatible with BSA programs. They also removed recognition of Love and Help, the program for Cub Scouts though it contained no mention of the policies. The UUA removed the material from their curriculum and the BSA renewed their recognition of the programs. When the BSA found that the UUA was issuing supplemental material with the Religion in Life workbooks that included statements critical of discrimination on the basis of sexual orientation or personal religious viewpoint, the BSA again withdrew recognition.

Unitarian Universalist Scouters Organization
The Unitarian Universalist Scouters Organization (UUSO) is an association of UU Scouts who offer religious emblem programs that are recognized by the BSA but not by the UUA.

History
The UUSO created the Living Your Religion program in May 2005 as a parallel award for Boy Scouts of the Unitarian faith. It was announced by P.R.A.Y. in the first quarter of 2005 that the BSA had accepted the Living your Religion award, but this was later redacted. The program was promoted at the 2005 National Scout Jamboree and shown as having BSA approval in the UUSO membership brochure and the Living Your Religion Guidebook. The UUA had stated that the UUSO is not recognized as an affiliate organization. The UUSO released the Religion and Family program for Webelos Scouts in February 2008.

Unitarian Universalist Association 
The Unitarian Universalist Association signed a Memorandum of Understanding with the Boy Scouts of America in March 2016 that reestablished the relationship, approving religious award programs for Cub Scouts and Boy Scouts as well as establishing a foundation for Unitarian Universalist congregations to charter Scout units. The Cub Scout religious award is called "Love and Help". The Boy Scout religious award is called "Religion in Life".

See Approved programs and awards

See also
 Religion in Scouting
 Scout Sunday or Scout Sabbath
 Religious emblems programs (Girl Scouts of the USA)

Notes

References

Advancement and recognition in the Boy Scouts of America
Religion and society in the United States